"Matthew and Son" is a single written, composed, and performed by Cat Stevens. It was selected as the title song for his 1967 debut album. Stevens was a newly signed teenage singer-songwriter, who performed to elaborate arrangements quite different from the skiffle which had, in part, inspired him to begin writing and performing.

The song remains Cat Stevens' highest charting single in the British Isles, reaching Number 2 in the UK and Number 3 in Ireland in early 1967.

Origins
The song, according to Stevens, took its name from the tailor, Henry Matthews, who made suits for Stevens, who thought up the story of the worker who is the main character in the song.

Stevens later commented, "I had a girlfriend, and she was working for this big firm, and I didn't like the way that she had to spend so much of her time working. The riff seemed to fit the words, Matthew and Son. There was a bit of social comment there about people being slaves to other people."

The song was covered by the band The Delgados in a 2002 Peel session and included on their 2006 collection The Complete BBC Peel Sessions.

The song's verse sounds similar to Tears For Fears' 1982 single "Mad World". Yusuf/Cat made a reference to this at a concert on his 2016 tour while playing 'Matthew and Son', inserting the lyrics 'I think it's kind of funny, I think it's kind of strange, yes I think it's kind of funny, that this sounds the same!‘.

Echo and the Bunnymen would borrow the melody for their 1983 hit "The Cutter"

Cat Stevens also refers to Matthew and Son, including a small four note riff from the original song, in a later song, "(I Never Wanted) To Be a Star" from his album Izitso.

Story
The song is about a business called Matthew and Son; workers there, some of whom have fifty years of experience with the business, are wage slaves, and because all of them are too apathetic and/or too timid to do so, none of them dare ask for raises, or promotions to higher-paying work, despite a commonality of financial hardship. ("He's got people who've been working for fifty years | No-one asks for more money 'cause nobody dares | Even though they're pretty low and the rent's in arrears.") They receive few breaks in their routine, and their food is generally poor. ("There's a five-minute break | And that's all you take | For a cup of cold coffee and a piece of cake.")

The kind of business in which Matthew and Son engages is not specified in the lyrics.
Most likely we can assume that Matthew and Son is an office in the city. ("The files in your head, you take them to bed, you're never ever through.")

In film
The song appears on the soundtrack of Michael Apted's Stardust.

Charts

Personnel
Cat Stevens - vocals
John Paul Jones - bass guitar
Nicky Hopkins - keyboards
Alan Tew – orchestral arrangements

References

1966 singles
Cat Stevens songs
Songs written by Cat Stevens
Deram Records singles
1966 songs
Song recordings produced by Mike Hurst (producer)
Songs about labor